Walnut Grove is an unincorporated community in Logan County, in the U.S. state of Ohio.

History
Walnut Grove was laid out in 1854, and named for a grove of black walnut trees near the original town site. A post office called Walnut Grove was established in 1890, and remained in operation until 1902.

References

Unincorporated communities in Logan County, Ohio
1854 establishments in Ohio
Populated places established in 1854
Unincorporated communities in Ohio